The cream-spotted mountain snake (Montaspis gilvomaculata) is a snake in the family Lamprophiidae . 

It is found in South Africa.

References 

Lamprophiidae
Reptiles of Africa
Reptiles described in 1991